Paratacamite is a mineral in the halide minerals category. Its name is derived from its association with atacamite.

It is found in Chile, Botallack Mine in Cornwall, Broken Hill, Australia, and in Italy in Capo Calamita on the island of Elba.

See also
 Atacamite

References

Halide minerals
Hexagonal minerals